Heini Müller (born 18 February 1934 in Roth, Bavaria) is a former German footballer.

Müller made 43 appearances for 1. FC Nürnberg in the Bundesliga during his playing career.

Müller's son, Bernd Müller (born 1963), was also a footballer, while his grandson, Jim-Patrick (born 1989), plays for SpVgg Unterhaching.

References

External links 
 

1934 births
Living people
People from Roth (district)
Sportspeople from Middle Franconia
German footballers
Association football midfielders
Bundesliga players
1. FC Nürnberg players
Footballers from Bavaria